The Historical Aircraft Restoration Society, often referred to by its acronym, HARS, is an Australian based aircraft restoration group. The group has two museums, at Shellharbour Airport in New South Wales, Australia, and Parkes, New South Wales, Australia. HARS was formed in 1979 by a group of aviation enthusiasts interested in the preservation of Australian Aviation History. Its mission is "To recover and where possible restore to flying condition, aircraft or types of aircraft that have played a significant part in Australian Aviation History both in the Civil and Military arenas".

The group possesses a collection which includes several large and significant aircraft such as a Boeing 707 and a Boeing 747-400. Many of its aircraft are kept at an airworthy standard, including a Lockheed L-1049 Super Constellation which is the last remaining flying example in the world. Other examples are kept at a taxiable standard where restoration of airframes to an airworthy standard is not feasible. The group operates a Navy Heritage Flight, which operates a range of ex Royal Australian Navy Fleet Air Arm aircraft in support of the Navy.

The group's Boeing 707 was formerly owned by actor John Travolta, who donated the aircraft to the group in 2017. As of May 2022, however, the aircraft is still in the United States, with the COVID-19 pandemic impacting the process to relocate the aircraft to Australia significantly.

The arrival of the 747 required significant preparation to allow the aircraft to land at the small regional Shellharbour Airport without damaging the runway.

Collection
Aircraft at the Shellharbour museum include:

Boeing 747-438 City of Canberra (VH-OJA)
Lockheed L-1049 Super ConstellationA
Consolidated PBY CatalinaA
Dassault Mirage IIIO (A3-42)
Lockheed P-2 NeptuneA (273 & 566)
Douglas C-47 Dakota (A65-94 & A65-95)A
Douglas C-54 SkymasterRA
Convair 440A
de Havilland Vampire (A79-637, now VH-FJWRA and A79-665)
Bristol Beaufighter
Bell AH-1 Cobra
de Havilland Australia DHA-3 DroverA
Cessna 310 (VH-REK)A
de Havilland Tiger MothA
CAC Winjeel
Cessna 180
Cessna 172
de Havilland Canada DHC-4 CaribouA (A4-210 and A4-234)
Let L-200 MoravaA
Auster Autocar
English Electric Canberra
General Dynamics F-111C
Grumman S-2G Tracker (N12-152812)
Lockheed AP-3C OrionA (A9-753)
Mikoyan-Gurevich MiG-21
Fokker F.VIIB/3m “Southern Cross” ReplicaRA

Aircraft at the Parkes museum include:

Lockheed AP-3C Orion A9-759
Lockheed P2V-5 Neptune A89-302
Lockheed P2V-7 Neptune A89-272
De Havilland Canada DHC-4 Caribou A4-275
Convair 580 VH-PDW
Westland Wessex HAS.31B 813 (N7-203)
Bell AH-1 Huey Cobra
de Havilland DH.114 Heron VH–AHB

A aircraft kept in airworthy condition.

RA aircraft under restoration to airworthy condition.

See also
List of aviation museums

References

Aircraft preservation
Historic preservation organisations in Australia
1979 establishments in Australia
Aerospace museums in Australia